Lee Haeng-Su  (born 27 August 1990) is a South Korean footballer who plays as a forward for Siheung City in the K3 League.

References

External links 

1990 births
Living people
Association football forwards
South Korean footballers
Daegu FC players
Gangneung City FC players
K League 1 players
Korea National League players
K3 League players